The Northern Mariana Islands's at-large congressional district encompasses the entire U.S. Commonwealth of the Northern Mariana Islands (CNMI). The territory does not have a voting member of Congress, but does elect a delegate who can participate in debates with the United States House of Representatives. On November 4, 2008, the first delegate was elected to the 111th United States Congress which began on January 3, 2009.

Establishment and history
From 1978 to 2009, in accordance with the territory's Constitution, the Northern Mariana Islands elected a Resident Representative in Washington, D.C. who was not considered an official member of Congress. They served two-year terms until 1990, when the terms were increased to four years.

Among nine candidates, independent candidate Gregorio Sablan won the election with 24% of the votes, and incumbent Resident Representative Pedro Agulto Tenorio (Republican) came in second with 21%. Sablan won re-election six times as an independent, but announced in 2021 that he would run as a Democrat for the 2022 election.

List of Resident Representatives

List of delegates representing the district

Election results

2008

2010

2012

2014

2016

2018

2020

2022

References

External links
 Commonwealth Election Commission, Northern Mariana Islands

 
2009 establishments in the Northern Mariana Islands
At-large United States congressional districts
At-large
Constituencies established in 2009
Government of the Northern Mariana Islands